This is a list of Philippine Basketball Association players by total career steals.

Statistics accurate as of January 16, 2023.

See also
List of Philippine Basketball Association players

References

External links
Philippine Basketball Association All-time Most Steals Leaders – PBA Online.net

Steals, Career